The Center for Plant Conservation (CPC) is a not-for-profit organization consisting of a network of more than 50 institutions. The mission is to conserve and restore the rare native plants of the United States and Canada. CPC represents a network of conservation partners, collectively known as CPC Participating Institutions (PIs), that collaboratively work to save the imperilling plants of the United States and Canada. CPC PIs maintain the CPC National Collection of Endangered Plants, a living conservation collection of imperilling plants. By working to collect and manage living seeds and plants, advancing the understanding of threats as well as the means to save these species, and communicating with partners within the CPC network, the CPC works to ensure the conservation of these rare plants. 

CPC is coordinated by a national office and guided by a volunteer board of trustees. By developing standards and protocols as well as conducting conservation programs in horticulture, research, restoration, and raising awareness, CPC’s network aims to avoid the extinction of rare plant species.

References 

Non-profit organizations based in the United States
Environmental organizations based in the United States
Plant conservation
Native plant societies based in the United States
San Diego Zoo